SS A. Mitchell Palmer (MCE-2436) was an EC2-S-C1 Type Liberty ship design cargo ship, named after U.S. Attorney General Alexander Mitchell Palmer. The ship's keel was laid by Southeastern Shipbuilding Corporation of Savannah, Georgia, on 17 December 1943, commissioned as part of the Second World War effort by the War Shipping Administration (WSA). It was launched 12 February 1944. It was scrapped in 1968 in Taiwan.

Important Events 
 1944 WSA (operated by the Isbrandtsen Steamship Company, New York); one of 200 American Merchant Marine ships at Normandy in June 1944
 1947 SuwaneeFruit & SS Corp, Jacksonville, USA.
 1951 Honduras Shipping Co, Tegucigalpa, Honduras
 1951 Renamed as the M/S Waimea, Compañía de Navegación Las Cruces, Panama – Honduras flag. (Carras Ltd, London)
 1954 Renamed as the M/S Annitsa a, Santa Anna Corp, Honduras flag (same managers).
 1956 (Angelos, Leitch & Co, London)
 1957 (Angelos & Co, London)
 1964 Renamed as the M/S Justice, Compañía de Navegación Pearl, Panama – Liberian flag (Ten Hu SS Co, Hong Kong).
 1966 Ideal United SS Corp, Liberia (Tai An SS Co, Taipei).
 1968 Scrapped Taiwan.

References

Liberty ships
Ships of American Export-Isbrandtsen Lines
1944 ships